Kathrin Stoll is an East German sprint canoer who competed in the early 1980s. She won a gold medal in the K-4 500 m event at the 1981 ICF Canoe Sprint World Championships in Nottingham.

References

East German female canoeists
Living people
Year of birth missing (living people)
ICF Canoe Sprint World Championships medalists in kayak